Zatyshne is a village located in Lenine Raion, Crimea. Population:

See also
Lenine Raion

References

Villages in Crimea
Lenine Raion